Thomas William Marshall may refer to:

Thomas William Marshall (controversialist) (1818–1877), Catholic controversialist
Thomas William Marshall (painter) (1875–1914), English painter

See also
Thomas Marshall (disambiguation)